The 2000 United States presidential election in Massachusetts took place on November 7, 2000, and was part of the 2000 United States presidential election. Voters chose 12 representatives, or electors to the Electoral College, who voted for president and vice president.

Massachusetts is one of the most reliable blue states in the nation: no Republican has won the state since Ronald Reagan in 1984. The 2000 presidential election featured Democratic United States Vice President Al Gore versus Republican Texas Governor George W. Bush. Despite Bush's tight victory nationwide, Gore handily won Massachusetts, with a 27% margin of victory against George W. Bush who did not actively campaign there. Gore didn't campaign in Massachusetts as well although his wife Tipper and the wife of his running mate Joe Lieberman, Hadassah, held a rally in Lieberman's hometown of Gardner. Gore won every county and congressional district. Massachusetts had been a Democratic-leaning state since 1928, and a Democratic stronghold since 1960, and has kept up its intense level of the sizable Democratic margins since 1996.

Bush became the first Republican ever to win the White House without carrying Barnstable County. As of 2020, this is the last time that a Democratic presidential nominee has failed to reach 60 percent of the vote in Massachusetts. This is also the last time that the towns of Ashby, Charlton, Douglas, East Bridgewater, Middleborough, Middleton, Lakeville, and North Brookfield voted Democratic in a presidential election and the last time that the towns of Chatham, Chesterfield, Orleans, Otis, and Rowe voted Republican. 

With 6.42% of the popular vote, Massachusetts proved to be Ralph Nader's third best state in the 2000 election after Alaska and neighboring Vermont.

Results

(a) John Hagelin was the candidate of the Natural Law Party nationally.

By county

Results by Congressional district
Gore won all 10 Congressional districts.

Results by municipality

See also
 United States presidential elections in Massachusetts

References

Presidential
Massachusetts
2000